Walter II, Lord of Egmond (in ) ( – 3 September 1321) was Lord of Egmond.

He was the second surviving son of Gerald/Gerard II of Egmond, who had died in 1300 before his own father William II, Lord of Egmond.  Walter became Lord of Egmond when his older brother, William III, died without offspring on 2 July 1312.  Under his rule the relationships of the house with the Egmond Abbey were normalized. In 1315 he participated with 60 of his people in a military expedition to Flanders. Before 1310 he married Beatrijs van der Doirtoghe/Doortoge ( -11 September 1323) from Naaldwijk. with whom he had five surviving children:
 John I, Lord of Egmond ( – 1369)
 Walter/Wouter (* )
 Yda  ( – 1366)
 Sofia (* )
 Gerald/Gerrit ( – )

References

1280s births
1321 deaths
Walter 2
People from Egmond
13th-century people of the Holy Roman Empire
14th-century people of the Holy Roman Empire